The Volunteers (also known as the Irish Volunteers) were local militias raised by local initiative in Ireland in 1778. Their original purpose was to guard against invasion and to preserve law and order at a time when British soldiers were withdrawn from Ireland to fight abroad during the American Revolutionary War and the government failed to organise its own militia. Taking advantage of Britain's preoccupation with its rebelling American colonies, the Volunteers were able to pressure Westminster into conceding legislative independence to the Dublin parliament. Members of the Belfast 1st Volunteer Company laid the foundations for the establishment of the United Irishmen organisation. The majority of Volunteer members however were inclined towards the yeomanry, which fought and helped defeat the United Irishmen in the Irish rebellion of 1798.

According to Bartlett, it was the Volunteers of 1782 which would launch a paramilitary tradition in Irish politics; a tradition, whether nationalist or unionist, that has continued to shape Irish political activity with the ethos of "the force of argument had been trumped by the argument of force". Irish republicanism an offspring of the Volunteers of 1782, owes much to influences of both the American and French revolutions.

Founding

As far back as 1715 and 1745, self-constituted bodies of defensive local forces were formed in anticipation of Stuart invasions. For example, in 1744 with the declaration of war with France and in 1745 the landing of Prince Charles Edward in Scotland, a corps of 100 men was enrolled in Cork, known as "The True Blues", which formed one of the regiments of the "United Independent Volunteers".

In 1757 and 1760 there were volunteer units formed due to the Seven Years' War and due to the French landing at Carrickfergus in 1760. The roll-call of the militia that marched on the French at Swinford listed in the "Collectanea politica", published in 1803, was titled "Ulster volunteers in 1760". From 1766 onwards units were embodied by local landlords in various parts of the country for the preservation of peace and the protection of property. Early volunteer groups (which later became part of the Volunteers) included: First Volunteers of Ireland (1 July 1766); Kilkenny Rangers (2 June 1770); First Magherafelt Volunteers (June 1773); and the Offerlane Blues (10 October 1773).

The rise of the Volunteers was a spontaneous event fired by patriotism and the threat of invasion, as another French landing was anticipated when war broke out in 1778. With British troops being dispatched from Ireland for the war with the American colonies, the landed gentry reacted nervously, and misunderstandings arose about Ireland's defence capabilities. Claims that Ireland was ill-prepared for an attack, along with alleged negligence from Dublin Castle, was used to justify the existence of Volunteer companies and their role in defending Ireland. In fact around 4,000 soldiers had been dispatched to the American colonies, leaving as many as 9,000 behind in Ireland.

The Volunteers were built upon existing foundations. Dublin Castle had created militias throughout the 18th century, however these had fallen into disuse. The Volunteers filled the gap left behind, with possibly half of its officers having held commissions in the militia. Historian Thomas Bartlett claims that the purpose of the militia as defined in 1715 would have fitted with the aims of the Volunteers: "of suppressing ... all such insurrections and rebellions, and repelling of invasions". Along with this, Irish Protestants of all ranks had a long, strong tradition of self-defence, having formed groups to resist and pursue agrarian insurgents and keeping a watchful eye on Catholics when threats arose.

The Volunteers were independent of the Irish Parliament and Dublin Castle, and this was an established fact by 1779. It is claimed that had the Lord Lieutenant of Ireland, John Hobart, 2nd Earl of Buckinghamshire, been more pro-active and assertive, then the Volunteers could have come under some form of government control.

The regular military deemed the Volunteers of low value in regards to helping repulse a foreign threat. Instead they held the view that they could be a "serviceable riot police", and it was this that they distinguished themselves for. For example, Volunteer companies did duty whilst regular troops had been called away, whilst others were used to pursue agrarian insurgents. When musicians were organised in Dublin following the introduction of a bill in the Irish Parliament seeking to outlaw textile workers' combinations, the Volunteers were mobilised to maintain the peace in case of public disorder.

The British victory over the Spanish off Cape St. Vincent in 1780 saw the fear of invasion dissipate, causing the Volunteers to also become involved in politics. Initially they started off agitating for reforms and measures to promote Ireland's prosperity, but later they moved from peaceful persuasion to "the threat of armed dictatorship".

Politics
The Volunteers however were also marked by liberal political views. For instance although only Anglican Protestants were allowed to bear arms under the Penal Laws, the Volunteers admitted Presbyterians and a limited number of Catholics, reflecting the recent Catholic Relief Act of 1778.

The Volunteers additionally provided a patriotic outlet, with each corps becoming a debating society. This brought about a shift in power with the Volunteers being controlled by progressive politically minded people and not by the Establishment. The Volunteers also saw the annual Protestant commemorations such as  the Battle of the Boyne and the Battle of Aughrim become displays of patriotic sentiment.

In Dublin on 4 November 1779, the Volunteers took advantage of the annual commemoration of King William III's birthday, marching to his statue in College Green and demonstrating for the cause of free trade between Ireland and Great Britain. Previously, under the Navigation Acts, Irish goods had been subject to tariffs upon entering Britain, whereas British goods could pass freely into Ireland. The Volunteers paraded fully armed with the slogan, "Free Trade or this", referring to their cannon. also cited "Free trade or a Speedy Revolution". According to historian Liz Curtis, the British administration in Ireland was vulnerable, and the Volunteers used this to press for concessions from Britain using their new-found strength. This demand of the Volunteers was quickly granted by the British government. The Dublin Volunteers' review, saluting a statue of King William III, in College Green on 4 November 1779 was painted by Francis Wheatley.

On 4 June 1782, the Belfast Troop of Light Dragoons volunteer company and the Belfast Volunteer Company paraded through Belfast in honour of the King's birthday. After firing three volleys, they marched to Cave Hill where they were joined by the Belfast Artillery Company, who upon their arrival fired a "royal salute of twenty-one guns". Nine years later on 14 July 1792 in contrast to this in a sign of changing opinions, on the second anniversary of the fall of the Bastille, the Belfast Volunteers exuberantly paraded through Belfast and agreed to send a declaration to the national assembly of France, to which they received "rapturous replies".

Dungannon Conventions

On 28 December 1781, members of the Southern Battalion of the County Armagh Volunteers (who formed the First Ulster Regiment) convened and resolved for a meeting in the "most central town of Ulster, which we conceive to be Dungannon", in which delegates from every volunteer association in the province of Ulster were requested to attend. The date of this meeting was pencilled in for "the 15th day of February next, at ten o'clock in the forenoon."
On the arranged date, 15 February 1782, delegates from 147 Volunteer corps arrived at the Presbyterian church, at Scotch Street, Dungannon for what would become known as the "Dungannon Convention of 1782". This church has formerly been the favourite meeting place of the Presbyterian Synod of Ulster and later the supreme ecclesiastical court of Irish Presbyterians. After the Volunteer convention it was afterwards known as the "Church of the Volunteers", although some later writers claim the actual meeting place was the Church of Ireland parish church at Drumglass.

This church was used for the next three conventions of Ulster Volunteer corps: 21 June 1782, with delegates from 306 companies attending; 8 September 1783, with delegates from 270 companies; and almost a decade later on 15 February 1793, when the "fires of patriotism that marked the birth of the movement were burning low", which the meeting "failed to kindle them anew".

The meetings
The first meeting is the best known. Many of the Volunteers were just as concerned with securing Irish free trade and opposing English governmental interference in Ireland as they were in repelling the French.
This resulted in them pledging support for resolutions advocating legislative independence for Ireland, whilst proclaiming their loyalty to the British Crown.
The first convention according to Sir Jonah Barrington, saw 200 delegates marching two by two into the church "steady, silent, and determined", clothed in their uniform and bearing arms. A poem by Thomas Davis states how "the church was full to the door". The lower part of the church was reserved for delegates with the gallery for their friends who required tickets for admission. Some people who attended the first and second conventions however consider them to be equally important.

After pressure from the Volunteers and a Parliamentary grouping under Henry Grattan, greater autonomy and powers (legislative independence) were granted to the Irish Parliament, in what some called "the constitution of 1782". This resulted in the Volunteers at the third convention proceeding to demand parliamentary reform, however as the American War of Independence was ending, the British government no longer feared the threat of the Volunteers.

The fourth convention in 1793 was held after a period of steep decline in Volunteer membership (see Demise below). This was partly the result of sharp division of opinion amongst Volunteers on political matters, so much so that the County Armagh companies refused to send any delegates to the fourth convention.

Relics
The bowl that was used as the pledging-cup of the Volunteers at the first convention was rediscovered in the 1930s in County Tyrone. This bowl was tub-shaped, resembling an Irish mether, and had the original owner's (John Bell) crest and initials engraved on the inside, as well as on the wooden base of it. Decorating this pledging-cup was three silver hoops bearing nine toasts, each of which was numbered as follows: 1. The King, 2. The Queen, 3. The Royal Family, 4. The Memory of St. Patrick, 5. The Sons of St. Patrick, 6. The Daughters of St. Patrick, 7. The Irish Volunteers, 8. The Friends of Ireland, 9. A Free Trade.

An obelisk commemorating the Dungannon Convention of 1782, was erected that year by Sir Capel Molyneux, on a hill a few miles north-east of Armagh city. On it is the following inscription: "This obelisk was erected by the Right Hon. Sir Capel Molyneux, of Castle Dillon, Bart., in the year 1782, to commemorate the glorious revolution which took place in favour of the constitution of the kingdom, under the auspices of the Volunteers of Ireland."

Motifs and mottos

The primary motif of the Volunteers was an Irish harp with the British crown mounted above it, with either the name of the company or a motto curved around it, or both, i.e. "Templepatrick Infantry" or "Liberty & Our Country". This harp and crown motif was prevalent on the Volunteer companies flags, belt-plates and gorgets. Some included the Royal cypher "G.R." standing for King George III. Shamrocks also commonly featured.

Other mottos included amongst variations: For Our King & Country, Pro Rege et Patria (for King and Country), Quis Separabit (none shall separate), and Pro Patria (for Country) Another Volunteer motto is the oft-repeated Pro Aeris et Focis (for our altars and our hearths), a truncated form of Pro Caesare, Pro Aeris et Focis (for our King, out altars, and out hearths), which was also used.

Competitions and awards

Competitions were held between Volunteer corps, with medals given out as marks of distinction for the best marksmen, swordsmen, as well as for the most efficient soldiers. The members of Volunteer corps from the province of Ulster, more specifically from the counties of Antrim, Armagh, Down, Londonderry, and Tyrone featured quite prominently and took an honourable place. Examples of marksmen competitions included best shot with ball and best target shot at 100 yards. Rewards of merit were also given.

Organisation

Originally each Volunteer company was an independent force typically consisting of 60 to 80 men In some parts of the country, a company could consist of between 60 and 100, and were raised in each parish where the number of Protestants made it viable. Alongside the parish companies, towns had one or more companies. For officers a company had as its highest rank, a captain, followed by a lieutenant, and ensign. They also had surgeons and chaplains. Local Volunteer companies would later amalgamate into battalions led by colonels and generals, some of which consisted of ten to twelve companies.

Volunteer members accepted no pay, however the more wealthy amongst them shared their funds with their poorer comrades, with officers donating towards the companies stock purse.

An example of the amalgamation of Volunteer companies is that of First Ulster Regiment, County Armagh. The First Armagh Company was raised in Armagh city on 1 December 1778, and on 13 January 1779, Lord Charlemont became its captain. As many new Volunteer corps were being raised throughout the county, a meeting was held at Clare on 27 December 1779, where they discussed forming these corps into battalions, with commanding officers appointed and the raising of artillery companies to complement them. This saw the creation of the Northern Battalion and Southern Battalion of the First Ulster Regiment.

Unlike the volunteer militias formed earlier in the 18th century, which had Crown commissioned officers, the private members of Volunteer companies in a form of military democracy appointed their own, and were "subject to no Government control". These officers were subject to being dismissed for misconduct or incapacity.

An example of Volunteers taking action against their own officers would be two officers commissioned to the Southern Battalion of the First Ulster Regiment: Thomas Dawson (commander) and Francis Dobbs (major). Both would also accept commissions in a Fencible regiment. This met with great disapproval amongst local volunteer companies who found them no longer acceptable as field officers. Lord Charlemont's own company, the First Armagh Company, even protested against the formation of Fencible regiments. By 1 January 1783, both Dawson and Dobbs had received their Fencible commissions and ceased to be volunteers.

Uniform
Of the 154 companies of Volunteers listed in The Volunteer's Companion (1794); 114 had scarlet uniforms, 18 blue, 6 green, 1 dark green, 1 white, 1 grey, 1 buff, and 12 undetailed. The details of the uniform of each corps varied depending on their choice of colouring for the facing on their uniforms, and for some the lace and buttons, amongst other pieces, for example: the Glin Royal Artillery's uniform was "Blue, faced blue; scarlet cuffs and capes; gold lace", whilst the Offerlane Blues' uniform was "Scarlet, faced blue; silver lace". The Aghavoe Loyals had "scarlet, faced blue", whilst the Castledurrow Volunteers wore green uniforms faced with white and silver lining.

Lord Charlemont desired that all county companies should have the same uniform of scarlet coats with white facings, however some companies had already chosen their colours, or were in existence before his involvement. Whilst information on clothing is scant, it has been suggested that most uniforms were made locally, with badges, buttons, cloth, and hats being procured from places like Belfast and Dublin. The Belfast News Letter carried advertisements from merchants offering: plated and gilt Volunteer buttons, furnished belt and pouch plates, engravings, regimental uniform cloth, and even tents. The painting of Volunteer drums and colours was also offered.

Leading Volunteer and Patriot, Henry Grattan, is recorded as wearing a blue Volunteer uniform, although in Wheatley's 1780 painting ""The Irish House of Commons: Henry Grattan urging the Claims of Irish Right, 8 June 1780"", Grattan is seen standing on the far right side of the canvas giving his speech and wearing a scarlet Volunteer uniform .

Naming
The naming of some Volunteer companies may show a continuation of earlier Protestant anti-Catholic traditions, with corps named after "Protestant" victories such as the Boyne, Aughrim and Enniskillen. Another "Protestant" victory, Culloden, the final battle of the Jacobite Rising of 1745, which saw the defeat of the Young Pretender, was used by the Culloden Volunteers of Cork company.

Reviews
Reviews of Volunteer corps were held since the earliest days of volunteering, with county companies travelling long distances to attend ones like the Belfast Reviews. Some reviews such as those in County Armagh originally were on a smaller scale, and consisted of a few companies assembling and performing field exercises in a particular district. They later became larger affairs with brigades consisting of battalions of companies.

The order of the day has been recorded for the Newry Review of 1785: most of the attending companies had marched to Newry on the Thursday, the day which Lord Charlemont also arrived. On Friday the companies that formed the First Brigade assembled and marched to the review ground, where Lord Charlemont would inspect them. His arrival was announced by the firing of nine cannons. On the Saturday, the same thing happened again this time for the Second Brigade. The review also demonstrated the attack and defence of Newry.

As the period of the Volunteers drew to an end, some such as those from the County Armagh Volunteers, started considering the larger reviews as a waste of time and energy. One Volunteer, Thomas Prentice, voiced a common opinion to Lord Charlemont that they would rather instead have a few companies meet a few times during the summer for drilling and improvement.

In March 1793 the assembly of armed associations was prohibited, making it illegal to hold a review. The last planned review was for one near Doagh on 14 September 1793 in County Antrim. Ammunition for it had been dispatched in secret a few days prior to companies with serviceable arms so that they can resist any opposition they encountered. An hour before the review was to be held, news spread that the 38th Regiment, the Fermanagh Militia, and detachment of Artillery had arrived in Doagh, resulting in the review being abandoned with no date for resumption.

Catholic emancipation
The Volunteers had no unified view in regards to Catholic emancipation, and their attitude towards Catholics were not uniformly hostile. The threat posed by Catholics was deemed to be near non-existent, and that local Volunteers were "under no apprehensions from the Papists". The Volunteers exerted considerable pressure on the British government to ease the Penal Laws on Catholics such as the Relief Acts of 1778 and 1782. The passing of the Relief Act of 1778, resulted in the Catholic hierarchy giving their support to the British in the American War of Independence, even so far as to having fasts for the success of British arms. The war also offered a chance for Catholics to show their loyalty.

As early as June 1779 this perceived lack of threat from Catholics, allowed them to be able to enlist into some Volunteer companies, and in counties Wexford and Waterford, tried to set up their own. The Catholic hierarchy however were "resolutely suspicious" of the Volunteers, even though generally Catholics "cheered on the Volunteers".

At the Dungannon Convention of 1782, a resolution was passed that proclaimed the rejoice at the relaxation of the Penal Laws, whilst saying that Catholics "should not be completely free from restrictions". In contrast at Ballybay, County Monaghan, the Reverend John Rodgers addressed a meeting of Volunteers, imploring them "not to consent to the repeal of the penal laws, or to allow of a legal toleration of the Popish religion". John Wesley wrote in his Journal that the Volunteers should "at least keep the Papists in order", whilst his letter to the Freeman's Journal in 1780, which many would have agreed with, argued that he would not have the Catholics persecuted at all, but rather hindered from being able to cause harm.

County Armagh disturbances
In the 1780s sectarian tensions rose to dangerous levels in County Armagh, culminating in sectarian warfare between the Protestant Peep o' Day Boys and the Catholic Defenders that raged for over a decade. Many local Volunteers, holding partisan views, became involved in the conflict. In November 1788, the Benburb Volunteers were taunted by a "Catholic mob" near Blackwaterstown. The Benburb Volunteers then opened fire upon the Catholics, killing two and mortally wounding three others. In July 1789, the Volunteers assaulted the Defenders who had assembled at Lisnaglade Fort near Tandragee, resulting in more lives being lost. In 1797 Dr. William Richardson wrote a detailed analysis for the 1st Marquess of Abercorn, where he claimed that the troubles were caused by the excitement of volunteering during the American Revolutionary War, which gave "the people high confidence in their own strength".

Belfast 1st Volunteer Company
Outside of Ulster, Catholics found few supporters as Protestants were a minority concerned with their privileges. In Ulster, Protestants and Catholics were almost equal in number and sectarian rivalries remained strong, exemplified by the County Armagh disturbances. In contrast, east of the River Bann in counties Antrim and Down, the Protestants were such an "overwhelming majority" that they had little to fear from Catholics, and became their biggest defenders.

According to The Volunteers Companion, printed in 1784, there were five different Volunteer companies in Belfast, the first of which was the Belfast 1st Volunteer Company formed on 17 March 1778. Delegates from this company to the national convention of 1782 were "bitterly disappointed" that their fellow Volunteers were still opposed to giving Catholics the vote. In 1783 they became the first company of Volunteers in Ireland to "defiantly" admit Catholics into their ranks, and in May 1784 attended mass at St. Mary's chapel. Indeed, the building of this chapel was largely paid for by the Belfast 1st Volunteer Company. In sharp contrast to this, no Roman Catholic was ever admitted into a County Armagh company.

In 1791, the Belfast 1st Volunteer Company passed its own resolution arguing in favour of Catholic emancipation. In October that year the Society of United Irishmen was founded, initially as an offshoot of the Volunteers. In 1792, a new radical company was created as part of the Belfast Regiment of Volunteers, the Green Company, under which guise the United Irishmen held their initial meetings. Wolfe Tone, a leading member of the United Irishmen, was elected as an honorary member of the Green Company, who he also calls the First Company, hinting that the Belfast 1st Volunteer Company reorganised itself into the Green Company.

Eventually the United Irishmen would advocate revolutionary and republican ideals inspired by the French Revolution. Ironically it was only 31 years previous when Belfast had called upon volunteer militias from counties Antrim, Armagh, and Down to defend it from the French.

Demise
The Volunteers became less influential after the end of the war in America in 1783, and rapidly declined except in Ulster. Whilst volunteering remained of interest in counties Antrim and Down, in other places such as neighbouring County Armagh, interest was in serious decline as was membership.

Internal politics too played a role in the Volunteers demise with sharp divisions of opinion regarding political affairs, possibly including "disapproval of the revolutionary and republican sentiments then being so freely expressed", especially amongst northern circles.

The ultimate demise of the Volunteers occurred during 1793 with the passing of the Gunpowder Act and Convention Act, both of which "effectively killed off Volunteering", whilst the creation of a militia, followed by the yeomanry, served to deprive the Volunteers of their justification of being a voluntary defence force.

Whilst some Volunteer members would join the United Irishmen, the majority were inclined towards the Yeomanry, which was used to help put down the United Irishmen's rebellion in 1798. Some of these United Irishmen and Yeomen had received their military training in the same Volunteer company; for example, the Ballymoney company's Alexander Gamble became a United Irishman, whilst George Hutcinson, a captain in the company, joined the Yeomanry.

Legacy
It was the Volunteers of 1782 that launched a paramilitary tradition in Irish politics, a tradition, whether nationalist or unionist, has continued to shape Irish political activity with the ethos of "the force of argument had been trumped by the argument of force".

The Volunteers of the 18th century set a precedent for using the threat of armed force to influence political reform. George Washington, also a member of the landed gentry, had written about them: "Patriots of Ireland, your cause is our own". While their political aims were limited, and their legacy was ambiguous, combining future elements of both Irish nationalism and Irish unionism.

The Ulster Volunteers founded in 1912 to oppose Irish Home Rule, made frequent reference to the Irish Volunteers, and attempted to link its activities with theirs. They shared many features such as regional strength, leadership, and a Protestant recruitment base. The Irish Volunteers, formed in November 1913, were in part inspired and modeled on the Ulster Volunteers, but its founders, including Eoin MacNeill and Patrick Pearse, also drew heavily upon the legacy of the 18th-century Volunteers.

Renowned Irish historian and writer James Camlin Beckett, stated that when the Act of Union between Great Britain and Ireland was being debated in the Parliament of Ireland throughout 1800, that the "national spirit of 1782 was dead". Despite this, Henry Grattan, who had helped secure the Irish parliament's legislative independence in 1782, bought Wicklow borough at midnight for £1,200, and after dressing in his old Volunteer uniform, arrived at the House of Commons of the Irish parliament at 7 a.m., after which he gave a two-hour speech against the proposed union.

Denis McCullough and Bulmer Hobson of the Irish Republican Brotherhood (IRB) established the Dungannon Clubs in 1905 ... "to celebrate those icons of the constitutionalist movement, the Irish Volunteers of 1782".

MacNeill stated of the original Volunteers, "the example of the former Volunteers (of 1782) is not that they did not fight but that they did not maintain their organisation till their objects had been secured".

One of the mottos used by the Volunteer's Quis Separabit, meaning "who shall separate us", which was in use by them from at least 1781, is also used by the Order of St. Patrick (founded in 1783), and is used by several Irish British Army regiments such as the Royal Dragoon Guards, Royal Ulster Rifles (previously Royal Irish Rifles), 4th Royal Irish Dragoon Guards, 88th Regiment of Foot (Connaught Rangers) and its successor the Connaught Rangers. It was also adopted by the anti-Home Rule organisation, the Ulster Defence Union, and is also the motto of the paramilitary Ulster Defence Force.

References

Sources
 Stewart, A.T.Q. (1998). A Deeper Silence: The Hidden Origins of the United Irishmen. Blackstaff, .
 Jackson, T.A. (1946). Ireland Her Own. Cobbett Press.
 Curtis, Liz (1994). The Cause of Ireland: From the United Irishmen to Partition. Beyond the Pale Publications. .
 F.X. Martin, T.W. Moody (1994). The Course of Irish History. Mercier Press. .
 Llwelyn, Morgan (2001). Irish Rebels. O'Brien Press. .
 Connolly, S.J., Oxford Companion to Irish History, Oxford University Press, 2007. 
 Kelly, M. J. (2006). The Fenian ideal and Irish nationalism, 1882–1916. Boydell & Brewer Ltd,..
 Townshend, Charles (1983). Political violence in Ireland: government and resistance since 1848. Clarendon Press. .

See also
 List of Irish Volunteer corps
 Ireland 1691-1801

Military units and formations established in 1778
18th century in Ireland
Military history of Ireland
1778 establishments in Ireland